Rundas is the Hittite god of the hunt and of good fortune. His emblem is a double eagle with a hare in each talon.

See also

 Hittite mythology

References

Hittite deities
Fortune gods
Hunting gods